Bryden Nicholas (born 10 March 1989 in Tauranga) is a New Zealand-Cook Islander slalom canoeist who has competed at the international level since 2005.

He finished in 21st place in the K1 event at the 2016 Summer Olympics in Rio de Janeiro.

He represented New Zealand until 2010. Since 2011 he has been representing Cook Islands like his sister Ella.

World Cup individual podiums

1 Oceania Championship counting for World Cup points

References

External links

1989 births
Living people
Cook Island male canoeists
New Zealand male canoeists
Canoeists at the 2016 Summer Olympics
Olympic canoeists of the Cook Islands
Sportspeople from Tauranga